Emilio Baldonedo (23 June 1916 – 31 May 1999) was an Argentine footballer and football manager. He played the best part of his career for Club Atlético Huracán in Argentina and went on to become the manager of a number of teams in the Argentine Primera.

Playing career
Baldonedo started his professional playing career with Huracán in 1935, he played for the club until 1944 scoring 165 goals in 257 league games. He is remembered as one of the most important strikers in the history of the club.

In 1940 he played six games for the Argentina national football team scoring seven goals.

Baldonedo joined Newell's Old Boys in 1945, but he only played 5 games for the club before moving to Mexico where he played for Monterrey and Puebla before retiring in 1947.

Managerial career
After his retirement as a player Baldonedo became a football manager, directing several teams in the Primera, including; Club Atlético Banfield, Boca Juniors, Chacarita Juniors and Independiente. He also managed a number of lower league teams such as Dock Sud and Barracas Central.

External links

 Huracán profile
 Clarín:  Don Emilio article

1916 births
1999 deaths
Club Puebla players
Footballers from Buenos Aires
Argentine footballers
Association football forwards
Argentine expatriate footballers
Argentina international footballers
Liga MX players
Argentine Primera División players
Club Atlético Huracán footballers
Newell's Old Boys footballers
C.F. Monterrey players
Expatriate footballers in Mexico
Argentine football managers
Club Atlético Huracán managers
Club Atlético Banfield managers
Boca Juniors managers
Chacarita Juniors managers
Club Atlético Independiente managers